The Sixties is a Canadian current affairs television program which aired on CBC Television from 1963 to 1966.

Premise
This program was similar to Citizens' Forum in that it was a co-production of the CBC and the Canadian Association for Adult Education which concerned newsworthy topics. Episodes featured a panel discussion which was led by Frank McGee for the first two seasons then by Charles Lynch in the final season. Subjects of international scope were presented such as foreign assistance, English-French relations in Canada, or the situation within and near the Communist Bloc.

Broadcast
The program was broadcast on Sunday afternoons in the first season after which it appeared on late Monday evenings. The half-hour program was broadcast as follows:

References

External links
 

CBC Television original programming
1963 Canadian television series debuts
1966 Canadian television series endings
1960s Canadian television news shows